LIC Housing Finance Limited (LIC HFL) is one of the largest Housing Finance Mortgage loan companies in India having its Registered and Corporate office at Mumbai. LIC HFL is a subsidiary company of LIC.

The main objective of the company is to provide long-term financing to individuals for the purchase or construction of houses or flats for residential purposes; The company also finances for the purpose of repair and renovation of existing flats and houses. The NBFC also provides financing on existing property for business and personal needs and gives loans to professionals for purchase or construction of Clinics, Nursing Homes, Diagnostic Centres, Office Space and also for purchase of equipments. The Company is very well known for providing long term financing to individuals engaged in the business of construction of houses or flats for residential purpose. LIC of India also holds promoter and controller status in IDBI Bank Ltd. from January 2019;

History
The company was incorporated on June 19, 1989, under the Companies Act, 1956. It is promoted by Life Insurance Corporation of India and went public in the year 1994. The maiden global depository receipt (GDR) issue was launched in 2004. The Authorized Capital of the Company is Rs.1500 Million (Rs.150 crore) and its paid-up Capital is Rs.1009.9 Million (Rs.100.99 crore). The Company is registered with National Housing Bank and listed on the National Stock Exchange (NSE) & Bombay Stock Exchange Limited (BSE) and its shares are traded only in Demat format. The GDR's are listed on the Luxembourg Stock Exchange.

Operations
In FY-2019, It has 9 regional offices, 24 Back-offices, and 282 marketing Offices across India. It also has 2 foreign offices in Kuwait and Dubai to cater to the Non-Resident Indians in the Persian Gulf countries covering the residents of Bahrain, Dubai, Kuwait, Qatar, and Saudi Arabia. It has more than 450 centres across India. The company also has more than 12000 marketing intermediaries or agents to guide through the loan processes. It also has an online home loan approvals facility through its website.

Listings and Shareholding
Listing: The equity shares of LIC HFL are listed on Bombay Stock Exchange and the National Stock Exchange of India. Its Global depository receipts are listed on the Luxembourg Stock Exchange.

Shareholding: On 31 March 2016, 48.49% of the equity shares of the company were owned by LIC. The Foreign Institutional Investors (FII) held approx. 32% of the shares. Around 158,000 individual public shareholders own approximately 9% of its shares. The remaining 18% shares are owned by Others.

Employees
The company had 1345 employees as on 31 March 2013, out of which 444 were women (31%) and 4 were employees with disabilities.
In its Annual report for FY 2012-13, the company reported that loan assets per employee as at 31 March 2013 were Rs. 53.63 crore and net profit per employee was Rs. 70.51 lakh. In the same financial year, it incurred INR 98.15 crore on employee benefit expenses.

As of 2019, the company has a total of 2103 employees, with a net profit per employee amounting to approximately Rs. 94.62 lakh.

References

External links 
 
 LIC HFL at Reuters

Financial services companies established in 1989
Housing finance companies of India
Financial services companies based in Mumbai
Life Insurance Corporation
Indian companies established in 1989
1989 establishments in Maharashtra
Companies listed on the National Stock Exchange of India
Companies listed on the Bombay Stock Exchange